Jeremy Bell may refer to:

Jeremy Bell (producer), for Percy Jackson and the Olympians (TV series) etc.
Jeremy Bell (basketball), played for Plymouth Raiders

See also
Jerry Bell (disambiguation)